The 2018 Qatar Total Open was a professional women's tennis tournament played on hard courts. It was the 16th edition of the event and a WTA Premier 5 tournament on the 2018 WTA Tour. It took place at the International Tennis and Squash complex in Doha, Qatar between 12 and 17 February 2018.

Points and prize money

Point distribution

Prize money

*per team

Singles main-draw entrants

Seeds

1 Rankings as of February 5, 2018.

Other entrants
The following players received wildcards into the singles main draw:
  Fatma Al-Nabhani
  Çağla Büyükakçay
  Ons Jabeur
  Maria Sharapova

The following players received entry from the qualifying draw:
  Catherine Bellis 
  Anna Blinkova
  Kateryna Bondarenko 
  Duan Yingying 
  Monica Niculescu
  Naomi Osaka
  Bernarda Pera
  Markéta Vondroušová

Withdrawals
Before the tournament
  Ashleigh Barty → replaced by  Donna Vekić
  Ana Konjuh → replaced by  Aleksandra Krunić
  Mirjana Lučić-Baroni → replaced by  Tímea Babos
  CoCo Vandeweghe → replaced by  Mona Barthel

During the tournament
  Simona Halep

Retirements
  Julia Görges
  Daria Kasatkina
  Magdaléna Rybáriková

Doubles main-draw entrants

Seeds 

 Rankings are as of February 5, 2018.

Other entrants
The following pairs received wildcards into the doubles main draw:
  Fatma Al-Nabhani /  Jessy Rompies
  Mubaraka Al-Naimi /  Ons Jabeur 
  Dominika Cibulková /  Vera Zvonareva

The following pairs received entry as alternates:
  Mona Barthel /  Carina Witthöft

Withdrawals
Before the tournament
  Irina-Camelia Begu

Retirements
  Barbora Strýcová

Champions

Singles

 Petra Kvitová def.  Garbiñe Muguruza, 3–6, 6–3, 6–4

It was Kvitová's first Doha title and second of the year and 22nd WTA title overall.

Doubles

  Gabriela Dabrowski /  Jeļena Ostapenko def.  Andreja Klepač /  María José Martínez Sánchez, 6–3, 6–3

External links
 Main website

 
Qatar Total Open
Qatar Ladies Open
2018 in Qatari sport
Qatar Total Open